Kofoworola Abiola Atanda is a veteran Nigerian actress popularly known by the moniker Madam Kofo for her role in the soap opera, Second Chance where she became popular for her signature head gears.

Career 
Madam Kofo started her career acting in stage productions by Hubert Ogunde and disclosed that her highest earning in her prime was ₦10.

In 1991, she produced a film titled Otu Omo which featured King Sunny Ade. She was awarded the special recognition award at 2021 Best of Nollywood awards.

Filmography
Second Chance
Winds of Destiny
The Campus Queen (2004)
The Narrow Path (2006)
Alter Ego (2017)

References 

Living people
Nigerian film producers
Year of birth missing (living people)
Nigerian television actresses
Nigerian women film producers
Nigerian film actresses
20th-century Nigerian actresses
21st-century Nigerian actresses